"Black Rain" is a single by the American rock band Soundgarden, featuring lyrics written by frontman Chris Cornell and music written by bassist Ben Shepherd and guitarist Kim Thayil. The single debuted at number 24 and number 14 on the US Billboard Alternative Songs chart and the US Billboard Rock Songs chart respectively in August 2010. It is also Soundgarden's only song to chart on the Billboard Hot 100, peaking at #96. The song appears on the compilation album Telephantasm and on the music video game Guitar Hero: Warriors of Rock and Guitar Hero Live. It was the first single that Soundgarden had released since 1997.

Origin and recording
The song was mostly recorded during sessions for Badmotorfinger in 1991. According to Kim Thayil, it was never properly finished: "There was drums and bass and some rhythm guitar and some scratch vocals and that was about it." The band did not like the original arrangement, but with the "magic of Pro Tools", the song could be re-arranged easily. Thayil said,  "[In] many ways, it's a new song." In 2010, the band reworked the original recording with Down on the Upside co-producer Adam Kasper, who was working with the band on archival material. Cornell noted that when they listened to the original recording for the first time after almost two decades, he immediately remembered the problems he had with the song.  Cornell explained that the original version of the song was much longer, and that he was unhappy with how it was arranged. He was also dissatisfied with the lyrics in the chorus. After so many years, however, Cornell noted that the issues seemed "easy to resolve". For the new mix, the music was re-arranged, the chorus vocals were re-written and re-recorded by Cornell, and new guitar overdubs were added.

Composition
The verse is notable for mostly being in the time signature 9/8; additional time signatures such as 15/16 and 3/4 also appear. In an interview with USA Today, Cornell said that "Black Rain" captures "that super heavy version (of the band) we were finally realizing to its fullest potential about 1991."

Release and reception
"Black Rain" was nominated for a Grammy Award for Best Hard Rock Performance.

Music video 
The music video for the song, the first for Soundgarden in over a decade, premiered on AOL.com on September 20, 2010. It was directed by Brendon Small of Metalocalypse and is the first artist-driven music video to be based on the show. Virtual band Dethklok also make cameo appearances in the video.

Track listing 
Radio promo

7" vinyl single included with Super Deluxe versions of Telephantasm

Charts

References

External links
 

2010 singles
Animated music videos
Soundgarden songs
Song recordings produced by Chris Cornell
Song recordings produced by Matt Cameron
Songs written by Chris Cornell
Songs written by Ben Shepherd
1991 songs
A&M Records singles
Songs written by Kim Thayil